Fredonyer Peak is a mountain located in the Modoc-Lassen Plateau of central Lassen County, California.  It is around 16.2 km (10.1 mi) east by north of Spaulding, California.

Standing at 2,452 m (8,045 ft), it is the highest point in the Modoc-Lassen Plateau.

Atop the mountain, there is an old fire lookout tower and a radio mast, accessible via dirt road.

References 

Mountains of Northern California
Mountains of Lassen County, California